Neville Douglas Peat  (born 1947) is a New Zealand author and photographer, based at Broad Bay on the Otago Peninsula. He specialises in topics about natural history, notably that of southern New Zealand and New Zealand's subantarctic islands. He has written over 40 titles since the late 1970s and has been writing full-time since 1986.

In 1994, Peat was named Dunedin Citizen of the Year for his series of photographic books on the city and his establishment of the Dunedin Environmental Business Network, and in 1996 won the Montana New Zealand Book Awards for his book Wild Dunedin. He has been a Councillor on the Otago Regional Council since 1998, and was its Deputy Chairperson from 2004 to 2007.

In 2004, Peat was behind moves to create an official flag for Otago. This culminated in a competition run through the auspices of the Otago Daily Times newspaper and Otago Polytechnic School of Art towards the end of that year.

In 2007, Peat was awarded the Creative New Zealand Michael King Writers' Fellowship, New Zealand's largest literary award. It allowed him to complete two major works, a comprehensive book on the Tasman Sea, and the third story in the "Lark" trilogy exploring the nature of southern New Zealand.

In 2016, he won the CLNZ Writers' Award for his project The Invading Sea.

In the 2018 New Year Honours, Peat was appointed a Member of the New Zealand Order of Merit, for services to conservation.

References

External links 
 Neville Peat – the author's website
 Smithsonian Study Tours' Neville Peat biography

1947 births
Living people
People from Otago Peninsula
New Zealand writers
Members of the New Zealand Order of Merit
New Zealand photographers
Otago regional councillors
Dunedin City Councillors